Alan Samuel Jeffrey (born 18 October 1963) is a former Irish cricketer. A left-handed batsman and left-arm medium pace bowler, he played 11 times for the Ireland cricket team between 1984 and 1989 including one first-class match and three List A matches.

Playing career

Jeffrey made his debut for Ireland against the MCC in June 1984. He played against the West Indies later that month and made his List A debut the following month against Surrey in the NatWest Trophy. He played against Wales eleven days later, but did not play for Ireland again for almost three years.

He returned to the Irish side for a match against Northamptonshire in June 1987, before playing six times in 1989. This included his only first-class game, against Scotland and his final List A game against Derbyshire. His final game for Ireland was against Wales.

Statistics

In all matches for Ireland, he scored 91 runs at an average of 22.75 with a top score of 28 against Wales in July 1984. He took 15 wickets at an average of 39.73, with best innings bowling figures of 3/22 against Scotland in July 1989.

References

1963 births
Living people
Irish cricketers
Sportspeople from Derry (city)
Cricketers from Northern Ireland